Oenomaus geba is a species of butterfly of the family Lycaenidae. It is found in lower montane forests in southern Brazil (Santa Catarina).

References

Butterflies described in 1877
Eumaeini
Lycaenidae of South America
Taxa named by William Chapman Hewitson